Austrovenus is a genus of marine bivalve molluscs, in the family Veneridae. This genus is native to New Zealand.

Species
Species in the genus Austrovenus include:
 Austrovenus aucklandica Powell, 1932 – Auckland Islands cockle
 Austrovenus stutchburyi (Wood, 1828) – New Zealand cockle, New Zealand little neck clam

References 

 Powell A. W. B., New Zealand Mollusca, William Collins Publishers Ltd, Auckland, New Zealand 1979 

Veneridae
Bivalves of New Zealand
Bivalve genera
Taxa named by Harold John Finlay